The little rush warbler or  African bush warbler (Bradypterus baboecala) is a species of Old World warbler in the family Locustellidae.

Range and habitat
It is found in Angola, Botswana, Burundi, Cameroon, Chad, Republic of the Congo, DRC, Ethiopia, Kenya, Malawi, Mozambique, Namibia, Nigeria, Rwanda, South Africa, South Sudan, Eswatini, Tanzania, Togo, Uganda, Zambia, and Zimbabwe. Its natural habitat is swamps.

References

External links
 Little rush warbler/African Sedge Warbler - Species text in The Atlas of Southern African Birds.

little rush warbler
Birds of Sub-Saharan Africa
little rush warbler
Taxa named by Louis Jean Pierre Vieillot
Taxonomy articles created by Polbot